César-Auguste Laraignée (born February 10, 1949 in Buenos Aires) is a former Argentine football defender who spent most of his career in France.

He played internationally for Argentina.

References

External links
Profile
Marc Barreaud, Dictionnaire des footballeurs étrangers du championnat professionnel français (1932-1997), L'Harmattan, 1997.

1949 births
Living people
Footballers from Buenos Aires
Argentine people of French descent
Argentine footballers
Argentina international footballers
Argentine expatriate footballers
Association football defenders
Club Atlético River Plate footballers
Stade de Reims players
Stade Lavallois players
FC Rouen players
Ligue 1 players
Ligue 2 players
Argentine Primera División players
Expatriate footballers in France
Argentine expatriate sportspeople in France
AC Avignonnais players